"Santé" (English: "Cheers") is a song by Belgian singer-songwriter Stromae. It was released on 15 October 2021 via Polydor Records. The song was written by Juanpaio Toch, Moon Willis and Stromae.

Content
"Santé" pays homage to those "who are not in the mood for celebrations" during the COVID-19 pandemic, including employees of catering and cleaning businesses, "caregivers, fishermen, drivers, [and] flight attendants". The name of the song is a play on the word "santé", which is used for celebratory toasts, but literally means "health" in French.

Music video
An accompanying music video directed by Jaroslav Moravec and Stromae's brother Luc Van Haver was released on 16 October 2021. It shows a cast of "cooks, fishermen and waitresses break from their routine to bust out into some dance moves".

Charts

Weekly charts

Year-end charts

Certifications

Release history

References

2021 singles
2021 songs
Stromae songs
Ultratop 50 Singles (Wallonia) number-one singles
Songs written by Stromae